The Co-ordination unit of the fight against terrorism is a French organization consisting of representatives from all active branches of the National Police.

Founded in 1984, this structure ensures the coordination of all departments involved in the fight against terrorism. It performs a daily analysis and synthesis of information relating to terrorism by working closely with the Central Directorate of Internal Intelligence, the Directorate-General for External Security, the National Gendarmerie and the General Directorate of Customs.

UCLAT coordinates the sharing of operational information from all relevant authorities and services involved in the fight against terrorism, including anti-terrorist judges and the prison administration.

UCLAT is directly attached to the Office of the Director General of Police.

Since 2007, UCLAT performs between 300 and 400 telephone tapping a week.

It has in the order of 80 staff.

External links
 (fr)  Renseignement et terrorisme  sur ladocumentationfrancaise.fr (en) Intelligence and Terrorism [archive] on ladocumentationfrancaise.fr
 (fr)  L’antiterrorisme espionne aussi mails et textos, Le Figaro, 28 mai 2007 [archive] (en) The anti-terrorism spying also mails and text messages, Le Figaro, 28 May 2007 [archive]
 (fr)  La coordination entre les services - Site du SGDN [archive] (en) The coordination between the services - Site NWMO [archive]

National Police (France)
Non-military counterterrorist organizations
1984 establishments in France